Parliamentary elections were held in the Dominican Republic on 16 May 2002. The result was a victory for the opposition Dominican Revolutionary Party-led alliance, which won 73 of the 150 seats in the House of Representatives. Voter turnout was 51.0%.

Results

References

Dominican Republic
2002 in the Dominican Republic
Elections in the Dominican Republic
Election and referendum articles with incomplete results
May 2002 events in North America